Below is a list of major music festivals in Israel:

Multidisciplinary
 Israel Festival

Music

Classical
Abu Ghosh Music Festival - vocal music 
Voice of Music in Upper Galilee Festival

Folk
Jacob's Ladder - folk, country rock and blues
Jerusalem International Oud Festival
Safed Klezmer Festival

Jazz
Red Sea Jazz Festival 
Super Jazz Ashdod festival
Tel Aviv Jazz Festival

Pop rock
Ein Gev Music Festival - Hebrew choirs and groups
Guitar Festival in the Desert - guitar
InDnegev - Israeli "indie" rock music
Tamar Festival - rock
Woodstock Revival Festival
Yearot Menashe Festival indie alternative music

References

Music festivals
 
Israel
Israel